Nsok-Nsomo is a municipality of Continental region in Equatorial Guinea.

An outbreak of Marburg virus disease began in Nsok-Nsomo in February 2023, promoting a local lockdown.

See also 

 Subdivisions of Equatorial Guinea

References 

Populated places in Kié-Ntem
)